William "Ike" Eickmeyer (born March 18, 1939) is an American politician, who was a member of the Washington House of Representatives, representing the 35th district from 1997 to 2009. He is a member of the Democratic Party.

References 

1939 births
Living people
Democratic Party members of the Washington House of Representatives
People from Spokane, Washington
20th-century American politicians
21st-century American politicians